Washington–Jefferson Street Historic District in Clarkesville, Georgia is a  mostly residential historic district. It was listed on the National Register of Historic Places in 1982 and includes 13 contributing buildings and a contributing site.

The district has about 12 houses, two antebellum Greek Revival churches (both built by master builder Jarvis Van Buren, one already listed on the National Register as Grace Church), and the city's small cemetery.  It is located along South Washington, South Jefferson, and Wilson Streets between Green Street and Laurel Drive.

References

Historic districts on the National Register of Historic Places in Georgia (U.S. state)
National Register of Historic Places in Habersham County, Georgia
Victorian architecture in Georgia (U.S. state)